Sharipov is a masculine surname, its feminine counterpart is Sharipova. It may refer to

Albert Sharipov (born 1993), Russian football player
Almasm Rabilavich Sharipov (born 1971), Russian citizen held in the Guantanamo Bay detention camps
Dariya Sharipova (born 1990), Ukrainian sports shooter
 Dinar Sharipov (born 1966), Russian football player
 Gennadiy Sharipov (born 1974), Uzbekistani footballer
 Fatyh Zaripovich Sharipov, the Hero of Soviet Union
 Ilkhom Sharipov (born 1968), Uzbekistan football defender
Kayumjan Sharipov (born 1991), Kyrgyzstani football player
 Khomiddin Sharipov, the Interior Minister of Tajikistan
Mirali Sharipov (born 1987), Uzbekistani judoka
Mital Sharipov (born 1972), Kyrgyzstani weightlifter
 Rustam Sharipov (born 1971), Ukrainian artistic gymnast
Sabina Sharipova (born 1994), Uzbekistani tennis player
 Salizhan Sharipov (born 1964), Kyrgyzstani cosmonaut
Umedzhon Sharipov (born 1991), Tajikistani football player

See also
Zabit Magomedsharipov (born 1991), Russian professional mixed martial artist

Surnames